The Centinela Solar Energy Project is a 170 megawatt (MW) photovoltaic power plant located on  of previously disturbed private land southwest of El Centro, California. The project planned to provide at least 235 jobs, generate more than $30 million in tax revenue over its life-time, and deliver enough electricity to power about 82,500 homes. Imperial County gave a green-light to the solar power plant on December 27, 2011, and Secretary of the Interior Ken Salazar approved the right-of-way over 19 acres for the connecting power line on public land.

The plant went online in tests on July 26, 2013.

It received a safety award in 2015.

Electricity production

References

Solar power stations in California